Thermoleophilum album is a bacterium obligate for thermophily and n-alkane substrates, the type species of its genus. It is Gram-negative, aerobic, small, and rod-shaped. It lacks pigmentation, motility, and the ability to form endospores, with type strain ATCC 35263.

References

Further reading

External links
LPSN

Bacteria described in 1986
Rubrobacterales